Cameron Richardson (born September 11, 1979) is an American producer, actress and model, who portrayed Chloe Carter on the CBS television miniseries Harper's Island in 2009.

Early life
Born in Baton Rouge, Louisiana, Richardson grew up in New Jersey. In 1997, she graduated from Old Bridge High School in Old Bridge Township, New Jersey. She moved to New York City to pursue modeling, and her agents suggested acting.

Cameron was called Cam-Bones because she was thin.

Career

Modeling
Richardson modeled for Mademoiselle, Interview, Cosmopolitan, and other fashion magazines. She appeared on the cover of Ocean Drive in 2006. She was cover model for the January–February 2008 issue of Women's Health Magazine. She has modeled clothes for American Eagle Outfitters, GAP, Lucky Brand Jeans, Chic Jeans, and Roxy amongst others. She advertised Dasani bottled water from The Coca-Cola Company. As of 2010, she can be seen modeling for Forever 21's maternity line.

Richardson appeared in a 2004 advertising campaign for burger chain Carl's Jr./Hardee's in which she ate a Western style burger while riding a mechanical bull to the tune of "Slow Ride" by Foghat.

Acting
Richardson guest starred on the FOX television show House (Season 2. Episode 13 "Skin Deep"). She played 15-year-old supermodel Alex, having herself been a model before getting into acting. She is known for her role as Paula Hargrove in Point Pleasant, a 2005 series on Fox. She also guest starred on the HBO television show, Entourage in the episodes "Strange Days", "Dog Day Afternoon" and "The Big Bang" in which she played a waitress named Lindsay who has a tryst in the coat room with character Vincent Chase during a silent auction. In 2009, she was a series regular on Harper's Island, a murder mystery television series. Promotions for the series describe her character Chloe as The Flirt. Richardson appeared in the film Alvin and the Chipmunks.

In 2012, Richardson appeared in an episode of CSI: Crime Scene Investigation, titled "Malice in Wonderland".

In 2013, Cameron Richardson played the role of Cheryl, Kev's (ex)wife, on the show “Shameless (season 3)”.

Awards
Richardson was ranked #76 in Stuff magazine's "102 Sexiest Women In The World" (2002). She was named #52 on the Maxim "Hot 100 of 2005" list, and modeled for the cover of the Hot 100 supplement.
She  appeared on the list until 2009 when she ranked #76.

Personal life
In 2002, Richardson appeared in the music video for the Incubus song "Are You In?".

She appears in the country music videos "I Don't Want This Night to End" and "Drunk On You" with Luke Bryan.

In March 2010 a visibly pregnant Richardson was photographed at the opening of the Odd Molly flagship store. Richardson gave birth to a boy named Milo Shulman in June or July 2010.

As of 2010, Richardson lived in Los Angeles.

Richardson married Louis Leterrier in 2021.

Filmography

Film

Television

References

External links

Cameron Richardson at AskMen.com
Cameron Richardson  at Maxim.com

1979 births
Living people
20th-century American actresses
21st-century American actresses
Actresses from Baton Rouge, Louisiana
Actresses from New Jersey
American female models
American film actresses
American television actresses
Old Bridge High School alumni
People from Old Bridge Township, New Jersey